Luis-Enrique Herrera (born 27 August 1971) is a Mexican former professional tennis player.

Career
Herrera was Mexico's national champion in the 12s, 14s and 16s junior events. He partnered Mark Knowles in the Boys' Doubles at the 1989 French Open and they finished runners-up.

He broke into the top 100 for the first time in 1991, after some good performances on the ATP Tour. Herrera reached the semi final of the Seoul Open and the quarter final in Washington. En route to the Washington quarter finals he defeated John McEnroe. He also won the gold medal at the 1991 Pan American Games, held in Cuba.

In 1992, he reached the third round of the Wimbledon Championships, having beaten veteran Jimmy Connors in four sets and Japan's Shuzo Matsuoka in five sets. This was the furthest a Mexican had gone at Wimbledon since Raúl Ramírez reached the quarters in 1978. He also made it into the semi-finals of the Manchester Open and along the way defeated second-seed Brad Gilbert, in a close three-set match which was decided in a tie break. However his most successful outing in 1992 came at Buzios, where he reached his only ATP Tour singles final.

Herrera had his third and final Grand Slam win in the 1993 Wimbledon Championships when he came from two sets down to defeat 15th-seed Karel Nováček in the opening round. Soon after he made the semi-finals of the tournament in Newport.

He played a total of 26 singles matches and four doubles matches for the Mexico Davis Cup team, for an overall record of 13–17.

ATP career finals

Singles: 1 (1 runner-up)

Doubles: 1 (1 runner-up)

ATP Challenger and ITF Futures finals

Singles: 14 (7–7)

Doubles: 9 (5–4)

Junior Grand Slam finals

Doubles: 1 (1 runner-up)

Performance timeline

Singles

References

External links
 
 

1971 births
Living people
Mexican male tennis players
Tennis players at the 1991 Pan American Games
Tennis players from Mexico City
Pan American Games medalists in tennis
Pan American Games gold medalists for Mexico
Central American and Caribbean Games gold medalists for Mexico
Central American and Caribbean Games medalists in tennis
20th-century Mexican people